Philotheca pungens, commonly known as prickly waxflower, is a species of flowering plant in the family Rutaceae and is endemic to south-eastern Australia. It is an undershrub with linear to narrow oblong or needle-like leaves and white flowers usually arranged singly in leaf axils.

Description
Philotheca pungens is an undershrub that typically grows to a height of  but often lies on the ground. The stamens are covered with long, soft hairs and the stye is glabrous.

Taxonomy
This species was first recorded by explorer Thomas Mitchell in 1836 when he ascended Mount Hope in northern Victoria. Mitchell described the plant as "a remarkable new species of Eriostemon forming a scrubby spiny bush, with much the appearance of a Leptospermum". It was first formally described in 1838 by botanist John Lindley, who gave it the name Eriostemon pungens and the description was published in Mitchell's book, Three Expeditions into the interior of Eastern Australia . In 1998, Paul G. Wilson changed the name to Philotheca pungens in the journal Nuytsia.

Distribution and habitat
Philotheca pungens grows in heathland and is found in south and south-east South Australia and in central and western Victoria as far east as Bendigo. Associated tree species include Eucalyptus leptophylla and Eucalyptus incrassata.

References

pungens
Flora of South Australia
Flora of Victoria (Australia)
Sapindales of Australia
Taxa named by John Lindley
Plants described in 1838